Sanjay Kumar (born 23 December 1967) is a former freestyle wrestler from India. He became Commonwealth Champion twice, along with finishing runner-up in the 1989 South Asian Games. Although wrestling was not part of the 1990 Commonwealth Games, United World Wrestling conducted the event for the same in 1991, in which Kumar won gold medal. He had represented India in both the junior and the senior World Wrestling Championships.

Along with amateur wrestling, Kumar was also active in the traditional Indian wrestling, where he won the Hind Kesari, the Bharat Kesari, and the Rustom-e-Hind title. He served in the Border Security Force (BSF).

In 1997, the Government of India conferred the Arjuna Award on him.

References

External links
Profile at the United World Wrestling

Living people
1967 births
Indian male sport wrestlers
Sport wrestlers from Haryana
People from Sonipat district
Indian male martial artists
South Asian Games silver medalists for India
South Asian Games medalists in wrestling
Recipients of the Arjuna Award
20th-century Indian people